Georg Simmel (1 March 1858 – 26 September 1918) was a German sociologist, philosopher, and critic.

Simmel was influential in the field of sociology. Simmel was one of the first generation of German sociologists: his neo-Kantian approach laid the foundations for sociological antipositivism, asking what is society?—directly alluding to Kant's what is nature?—presenting pioneering analyses of social individuality and fragmentation. For Simmel, culture referred to "the cultivation of individuals through the agency of external forms which have been objectified in the course of history." Simmel discussed social and cultural phenomena in terms of "forms" and "contents" with a transient relationship, wherein form becomes content, and vice versa dependent on context. In this sense, Simmel was a forerunner to structuralist styles of reasoning in the social sciences. With his work on the metropolis, Simmel would also be a precursor of urban sociology, symbolic interactionism, and social network analysis.

An acquaintance of Max Weber, Simmel wrote on the topic of personal character in a manner reminiscent of the sociological 'ideal type'. He broadly rejected academic standards, however, philosophically covering topics such as emotion and romantic love. Both Simmel and Weber's nonpositivist theory would inform the eclectic critical theory of the Frankfurt School.

Simmel's most famous works today are The Problems of the Philosophy of History (1892), The Philosophy of Money (1900), The Metropolis and Mental Life (1903), and Fundamental Questions of Sociology (1917), as well as Soziologie (1908), which compiles various essays of Simmel's, including "The Stranger", "The Social Boundary", "The Sociology of the Senses", "The Sociology of Space", and "On The Spatial Projections of Social Forms". He also wrote extensively on the philosophy of Schopenhauer and Nietzsche, as well on art, most notably through his Rembrandt: An Essay in the Philosophy of Art (1916).

Biography

Early life and education 
Georg Simmel was born in Berlin, Germany, as the youngest of seven children to an assimilated Jewish family. His father, Eduard Simmel (1810–1874), a prosperous businessman and convert to Roman Catholicism, had founded a confectionery store called "Felix & Sarotti" that would later be taken over by a chocolate manufacturer. His mother Flora Bodstein (1818–1897) came from a Jewish family who had converted to Lutheranism. Georg, himself, was baptized as a Protestant when he was a child. 
His father died in 1874, when Georg was 16, leaving a sizable inheritance. Georg was then adopted by Julius Friedländer, the founder of an international music publishing house known as Peters Verlag, who endowed him with the large fortune that enabled him to become a scholar.

Beginning in 1876, Simmel studied philosophy and history at the Humboldt University of Berlin, going on to receive his doctorate in 1881 for his thesis on Kantian philosophy of matter, titled "" ("The Nature of Matter According to Kant's Physical Monadology").

Later life
In 1890, Georg married Gertrud Kinel, a philosopher who published under the pseudonym Marie-Luise Enckendorf, and under her own name. They lived a sheltered and bourgeois life, their home becoming a venue for cultivated gatherings in the tradition of the salon. They had one son, Hans Eugen Simmel, who became a medical doctor. Georg and Gertrud's granddaughter was the psychologist Marianne Simmel. Simmel also had a secret affair with his assistant Gertrud Kantorowicz, who bore him a daughter in 1907, though this fact was hidden until after Simmel's death.

In 1917, Simmel stopped reading the newspapers and withdrew to the Black Forest to finish the book The View of Life (Lebensanschauung). Shortly before the end of the war in 1918, he died from liver cancer in Strasbourg.

Career
In 1885, Simmel became a privatdozent at the University of Berlin, officially lecturing in philosophy but also in ethics, logic, pessimism, art, psychology and sociology. His lectures were not only popular inside the university, but attracted the intellectual elite of Berlin as well. Although his applications for vacant chairs at German universities were supported by Max Weber, Simmel remained an academic outsider. However, with the support of an inheritance from his guardian, he was able to pursue his scholarly interests for many years without needing a salaried position.

Simmel had a hard time gaining acceptance in the academic community despite the support of well known associates, such as Max Weber, Rainer Maria Rilke, Stefan George and Edmund Husserl. This was partly because he was seen as a Jew during an era of anti-Semitism, but also simply because his articles were written for a general audience rather than academic sociologists. This led to dismissive judgements from other professionals. Simmel nevertheless continued his intellectual and academic work, as well as taking part in artistic circles.

In 1909, Simmel, together with Ferdinand Tönnies and Max Weber, and others, was a co-founder of the German Society for Sociology, serving as a member of its first executive body.

In 1914, Simmel received an ordinary professorship with chair, at the then German University of Strassburg, but did not feel at home there. Because World War I broke out, all academic activities and lectures were halted and lecture halls were converted to military hospitals. In 1915 he applied – without success – for a chair at the University of Heidelberg. He remained at the University of Strasbourg until his death in 1918.

Prior to World War I, Simmel had not been very interested in contemporary history, but rather in looking at the interactions, art and philosophy of his time. However, after its start, he was interested in its unfolding. Yet, he seems to give conflicting opinions of events, being a supporter in "Germany's inner transformation," more objective in "the idea of Europe" and a critic in "The crisis of culture."  Eventually, Simmel grew tired of the war, especially in the year of his death.

Theory
There are four basic levels of concern in Simmel's work:

 The psychological workings of social life 
 The sociological workings of interpersonal relationships.
 The structure of and changes in zeitgeist (i.e. the social and cultural "spirit") of his time. He would also adopt the principle of emergentism, the idea that higher levels of conscious properties emerge from lower levels.
 The nature and inevitable fate of humanity.

Dialectical method

A dialectical approach is a multicausal and multidirectional method: it focuses on social relations; integrates facts and value, rejecting the idea that there are hard and fast dividing lines between social phenomena; looks not only at the present, but also at the past and future; and is deeply concerned with both conflicts and contradictions. Simmel's sociology was concerned with relationships—especially interaction—and was thus known as a  relationalist. This approach is based on the idea that interactions exist between everything. Overall, Simmel would be mostly interested in dualisms, conflicts, and contradictions in whatever realm of the social world he happened to be working on.

Forms of association 
The furthest Simmel has brought his work to a micro-level of analysis was in dealing with forms and interactions that takes place with different types of people. Such forms would include subordination, superordination, exchange, conflict and sociability.

Simmel focused on these forms of association while paying little attention to individual consciousness. Simmel believed in the creative consciousness that can be found in diverse forms of interaction, which he observed both the ability of actors to create social structures, as well as the disastrous effects such structures had on the creativity of individuals. Simmel also believed that social and cultural structures come to have a life of their own.

Sociability
Simmel refers to "all the forms of association by which a mere sum of separate individuals are made into a 'society'," whereby society is defined as a "higher unity," composed of individuals.

Simmel would especially be fascinated by man's "impulse to sociability," whereby "the solitariness of the individuals is resolved into togetherness," referring to this unity as "the free-playing, interacting interdependence of individuals." Accordingly, he defines sociability as "the play-form of association" driven by "amicability, breeding, cordiality and attractiveness of all kinds." In order for this free association to occur, Simmel explains, "the personalities must not emphasize themselves too individually...with too much abandon and aggressiveness." Rather, "this world of sociability...a democracy of equals" is to be without friction so long as people blend together in the spirit of pleasure and bringing "about among themselves a pure interaction free of any disturbing material accent."

Simmel describes idealized interactions in expressing that "the vitality of real individuals, in their sensitivities and attractions, in the fullness of their impulses and convictions...is but a symbol of life, as it shows itself in the flow of a lightly amusing play," adding that "a symbolic play, in whose aesthetic charm all the finest and most highly sublimated dynamics of social existence and its riches are gathered."

Social geometry
In a dyad (i.e. a two-person group), a person is able to retain their individuality as there is no fear that another may shift the balance of the group. In contrast, triads (i.e. three-person groups) risk the potential of one member becoming subordinate to the other two, thus threatening their individuality. Furthermore, were a triad to lose a member, it would become a dyad.

The basic nature of this dyad-triad principle forms the essence of structures that form society. As a group (structure) increases in size, it becomes more isolated and segmented, whereby the individual also becomes further separated from each member. In respect to the notion of "group size", Simmel's view was somewhat ambiguous. On one hand, he believed that the individual benefits most when a group gets bigger, as such makes it harder to exert control on the individual. On the other hand, with a large group there is a possibility of the individual becoming distant and impersonal. Therefore, in an effort for the individual to cope with the larger group they must become a part of a smaller group such as the family.

The value of something is determined by the distance from its actor. In "The Stranger", Simmel discusses how if a person is too close to the actor they are not considered a stranger. If they are too far, however, they would no longer be a part of a group. The particular distance from a group allows a person to have objective relationships with different group members.

Views

On the metropolis

One of Simmel's most notable essays is "The Metropolis and Mental Life" ("") from 1903, which was originally given as one of a series of lectures on all aspects of city life by experts in various fields, ranging from science and religion to art. The series was conducted alongside the Dresden cities exhibition of 1903. Simmel was originally asked to lecture on the role of intellectual (or scholarly) life in the big city, but he effectively reversed the topic in order to analyze the effects of the big city on the mind of the individual. As a result, when the lectures were published as essays in a book, to fill the gap, the series editor himself had to supply an essay on the original topic.

The Metropolis and Mental Life was not particularly well received during Simmel's lifetime. The organizers of the exhibition over-emphasized its negative comments about city life, because Simmel also pointed out positive transformations. During the 1920s the essay was influential on the thinking of Robert E. Park and other American sociologists at the University of Chicago who collectively became known as the "Chicago School". It gained wider circulation in the 1950s when it was translated into English and published as part of Kurt Wolff's edited collection, The Sociology of Georg Simmel. It now appears regularly on the reading lists of courses in urban studies and architecture history. However, it is important to note that the notion of the blasé is actually not the central or final point of the essay, but is part of a description of a sequence of states in an irreversible transformation of the mind. In other words, Simmel does not quite say that the big city has an overall negative effect on the mind or the self, even as he suggests that it undergoes permanent changes. It is perhaps this ambiguity that gave the essay a lasting place in the discourse on the metropolis.

The Philosophy of Money

In The Philosophy of Money, Simmel views money as a component of life which helped us understand the totality of life. Simmel believed people created value by making objects, then separating themselves from that object and then trying to overcome that distance. He found that things which were too close were not considered valuable and things which were too far for people to get were also not considered valuable. Considered in determining value was the scarcity, time, sacrifice, and difficulties involved in getting the object.

For Simmel, city life led to a division of labor and increased financialization. As financial transactions increase, some emphasis shifts to what the individual can do, instead of who the individual is. Financial matters in addition to emotions are in play.

The Stranger

Simmel's concept of distance comes into play where he identifies a stranger as a person that is far away and close at the same time.

A stranger is far enough away that he is unknown but close enough that it is possible to get to know him. In a society there must be a stranger. If everyone is known then there is no person that is able to bring something new to everybody.

The stranger bears a certain objectivity that makes him a valuable member to the individual and society. People let down their inhibitions around him and confess openly without any fear. This is because there is a belief that the Stranger is not connected to anyone significant and therefore does not pose a threat to the confessor's life.

More generally, Simmel observes that because of their peculiar position in the group, strangers often carry out special tasks that the other members of the group are either incapable or unwilling to carry out. For example, especially in pre-modern societies, most strangers made a living from trade, which was often viewed as an unpleasant activity by "native" members of those societies. In some societies, they were also employed as arbitrators and judges, because they were expected to treat rival factions in society with an impartial attitude.

On one hand the stranger's opinion does not really matter because of his lack of connection to society, but on the other the stranger's opinion does matter, because of his lack of connection to society. He holds a certain objectivity that allows him to be unbiased and decide freely without fear. He is simply able to see, think, and decide without being influenced by the opinion of others.

On secrecy
According to Simmel, in small groups, secrets are less needed because everyone seems to be more similar. In larger groups secrets are needed as a result of their heterogeneity. In secret societies, groups are held together by the need to maintain the secret, a condition that also causes tension because the society relies on its sense of secrecy and exclusion.
For Simmel, secrecy exists even in relationships as intimate as marriage.In revealing all, marriage becomes dull and boring and loses all excitement. Simmel saw a general thread in the importance of secrets and the strategic use of ignorance: To be social beings who are able to cope successfully with their social environment, people need clearly defined realms of unknowns for themselves. Furthermore, sharing a common secret produces a strong "we feeling." The modern world depends on honesty and therefore a lie can be considered more devastating than it ever has been before.
Money allows a level of secrecy that has never been attainable before, because money allows for "invisible" transactions, due to the fact that money is now an integral part of human values and beliefs. It is possible to buy silence.

On flirtation
In his multi-layered essay, "Women, Sexuality & Love", published in 1923, Simmel discusses flirtation as a generalized type of social interaction. According to Simmel, "to define flirtation as simply a 'passion for pleasing' is to confuse the means to an end with the desire for this end." The distinctiveness of the flirt lies in the fact that she awakens delight and desire by means of a unique antithesis and synthesis: through the alternation of accommodation and denial. In the behavior of the flirt, the man feels the proximity and interpenetration of the ability and inability to acquire something. This is in essence the "price." A sidelong glance with the head half-turned is characteristic of flirtation in its most banal guise.

On fashion
In the eyes of Simmel, fashion is a form of social relationship that allows those who wish to conform to the demands of a group to do so. It also allows some to be individualistic by deviating from the norm. There are many social roles in fashion and both objective culture and individual culture can have an influence on people. In the initial stage everyone adopts what is fashionable and those that deviate from the fashion inevitably adopt a whole new view of what they consider fashion. Ritzer wrote:

This means that those who are trying to be different or "unique," are not, because in trying to be different they become a part of a new group that has labeled themselves different or "unique".

Works
Simmel's major monographic works include, in chronological order:

 Über sociale Differenzierung (1890). Leipzig: Duncker & Humblot [On Social Differentiation]
 Einleitung in die Moralwissenschaft 1 & 2 (1892–1893). Berlin: Hertz [Introduction to the Science of Ethics]
 Die Probleme der Geschichtphilosophie (1892). Leipzig: Duncker & Humblot. (2nd ed., 1905) [The Problems of the Philosophy of History]
 Philosophie des Geldes (1900). Leipzig: Duncker & Humblot (2nd ed., 1907) [The Philosophy of Money]
 Die Großstädte und das Geistesleben (1903). Dresden: Petermann. [The Metropolis and Mental Life]
 Kant (1904). Leipzig: Duncker & Humblot. (6th ed., 1924)
 Philosophie der Mode (1905). Berlin: Pan-Verlag.
 Kant und Goethe (1906). Berlin: Marquardt.
 Die Religion (1906). Frankfurt am Main: Rütten & Loening. (2nd ed., 1912).
 Schopenhauer und Nietzsche (1907). Leipzig: Duncker & Humblot.
 Soziologie (1908). Leipzig: Duncker & Humblot. [Sociology : inquiries into the construction of social forms]
 Hauptprobleme der Philosophie (1910). Leipzig: Göschen.
 Philosophische Kultur (1911) Leipzig: Kröner. (2nd ed., 1919).
 Goethe (1913). Leipzig: Klinkhardt.
 Rembrandt (1916) Leipzig: Wolff.
 Grundfragen der Soziologie (1917) Berlin: Göschen. [Fundamental Questions of Sociology]
 Lebensanschauung (1918). München: Duncker & Humblot. [The View of Life]
 Zur Philosophie der Kunst (1922). Potsdam: Kiepenheur.
 Fragmente und Aufsäze aus dem Nachlass (1923), edited by G. Kantorowicz. München: Drei Masken Verlag.
 Brücke und Tür (1957), edited by M. Landmann & M. Susman. Stuttgart: Koehler.

Works in periodicals
 "Rom, eine ästhetische Analyse." Die Zeit, Wiener Wochenschrift für Politik, Vollwirtschaft Wissenschaft und Kunst [weekly newspaper] (28 May 1898).
 "Florenz." Der Tag [magazine] (2 March 1906).
 "Venedig." Der Kunstwart, Halbmonatsschau über Dichtung, Theater, Musik, bildende und angewandte Kunst [magazine] (June 1907).

See also
 Definitions of philosophy
 Kantianism
 Karl Mannheim

References

Further reading

Edited works of Simmel 

Andrews, John A. Y., and Donald N. Levine, trans. 2010. The View of Life: Four Metaphysical Essays with Journal Aphorisms, with introduction by D. N. Levine and D. Silver. Chicago: University of Chicago Press.
Levine, Donald, ed. 1972. On Individuality and Social Forms. Chicago: University of Chicago Press.
 Wolff, Kurt, trans. & ed. 1950. The Sociology of Georg Simmel. Glencoe, IL: Free Press.
Wolff, Kurt, trans. & ed. 1955. Conflict and the Web of Group Affiliations (1922). Glencoe, IL: Free Press.

Works on Simmel 

Ankerl, Guy. 1972. Sociologues Allemands. Sociologie de la forme. Neuchâtel: . pp. 73–106.
Best, Shaun, 2019. The Stranger, London, Routledge: .
Bistis, Margo. 2005. "Simmel and Bergson: The Theorist and the Exemplar of the Blasé Person." Journal of European Studies 35(4):395–418.
Hartmann, Alois. 2003. "Sinn und Wert des Geldes." In der Philosophie von Georg Simmel und Adam (von) Müller. Berlin. .
Ionin, Leonid. 1989. "Georg Simmel's Sociology." Pp. 189–205. in A History of Classical Sociology, edited by I. S. Kon, translated by H. Campbell Creighton. Moscow: Progress Publishers.
 Karakayali, Nedim. 2003. Simmel's Stranger: In Theory and in Practice. PhD Thesis. Toronto: University of Toronto.
 — 2006. "The Uses of the Stranger: Circulation, Arbitration, Secrecy and Dirt". Sociological Theory 24(4):312–30.
 Kim, David, ed. 2006. Georg Simmel in Translation: Interdisciplinary Border-Crossings in Culture and Modernity. Cambridge: Cambridge Scholars Press. .
Muller, Jerry Z. 2002. The Mind and the Market: Capitalism in Western Thought. Anchor Books.

External links

 Detailed overview, extracts and essays on Simmel at University of Chicago
 Sociology in Switzerland presents Georg Simmel Online
 Review materials for studying Georg Simmel
 A short biography of Simmel
 A detailed biography and appreciation of Simmel
 About Simmel and his works
 The Social Role of Money
 The Metropolis and Mental Life 
 Jürgen Habermas, Georg Simmel on Philosophy and Culture: Postscript to a Collection of Essays, Translated by Mathieu Deflem, Critical Inquiry, 22(3), pp. 403–414, Spring 1996
 
 

1858 births
1918 deaths
19th-century essayists
19th-century German non-fiction writers
19th-century German male writers
19th-century German philosophers
20th-century essayists
20th-century German non-fiction writers
20th-century German writers
20th-century German philosophers
Deaths from liver cancer
German ethicists
19th-century German Jews
German male essayists
German male non-fiction writers
German sociologists
Humboldt University of Berlin alumni
Academic staff of the Humboldt University of Berlin
Jewish philosophers
Jewish sociologists
Kantian philosophers
People from the Province of Brandenburg
Philosophers of culture
Philosophers of history
Philosophers of religion
Rembrandt scholars
Social philosophers
Sociologists of religion
Academic staff of the University of Strasbourg
Writers from Berlin